Abbott Elementary is an American television series created by Quinta Brunson for ABC. It stars Brunson as a second grade teacher at Abbott Elementary, a fictional predominantly Black school in Philadelphia. The ensemble cast includes Tyler James Williams, Janelle James, Lisa Ann Walter, Chris Perfetti, Sheryl Lee Ralph and William Stanford Davis. The following is a list of characters, including the main cast and those who appear alongside the main cast in the series.

Main characters

Janine Teagues 

Janine Teagues is the plucky and optimistic lead of the series who works as a second-grade teacher at Abbott Elementary. Throughout the series she remains unjaded by all of the things the school lacks and strives to make sure her students have enough to learn and grow. While helping the students of Abbott, Janine also deals with challenges and relationships within her personal life.

Season 1 
During the events of the first season, Janine is looked over by the staff of Abbott, particularly Ava who bullies her numerous times. Within the season, she dates Tariq, who she has been with since the 8th grade. She struggles with the thought of ending her relationship with Tariq; with the staff of Abbott siding with their breakup. At the end of the season, she breaks up with him when he decides to move to New York City to endure his career as a professional rapper.

Season 2 
In the second season, Janine struggles to get over Tariq and has troubles paying her rent, since she originally split the bill monthly with Tariq. In "The Principals Office", while trying to rekindle Melissa's relationship with her sister Kristen Marie, Janine describes her complicated family history, with a mother who never paid her any attention and a sister who lives in another state. In "Candy Zombies", Janine reveals to Barbara and Melissa that she has no outside-of-work friends following her breakup with Tariq; however Erika, an old friend of Janine and Tariq, supports Janine and invites her to parties to increase her social mobility. Janine invites her distant sister Ayesha to visit during "Fight". She is asked out by Gregory's friend Maurice in "The Fundraiser", which makes him jealous.

Relationship with Gregory 
While hinted at in the pilot episode, Janine and Gregory have a friendship that is apparent in almost every episode. Both teach classes next to each other and have developed a special bond. In "Holiday Hookah", Gregory and Janine almost kiss for the first time while outside of a hookah club. Before being interrupted by Amber, who calls Gregory right before it can happen. However following his break up with Amber, both Janine and Gregory share a drunken kiss at a teacher conference.

When asked by late-night host James Corden about the relationship of Gregory and Janine, Tyler James Williams stated:

Their relationship has been compared to that of Jim Halpert and Pam Beesly's relationship from The Office; which already shares many similarities with Abbott Elementary.

Gregory Eddie 

Gregory Eddie is the co-lead of the series and a  substitute, later full-time, first-grade teacher at Abbott. While never outright stated, it is strongly hinted that Gregory harbors a crush on Janine, he hides it well. When he arrives at Abbott during the pilot episode, Gregory reveals that he originally applied to be the school's principal, and is upset with an unqualified Ava for taking the job he worked hard to obtain.

Season 1 
When Gregory is hired as a substitute to cover for Tina, he immediately befriends Janine; who teaches a class right beside his. In "Open House", Gregory receives a phone call from his unsupportive father (portrayed by Orlando Jones) who tells him that he should leave his career of teaching and pursue a more stable career. He also meets Barbara's daughter Taylor whom he begins dating. He applies to be a full-time teacher in the season finale, which he ultimately gets due to the school being unable to find a full-time replacement for Tina.

Season 2  
During the second season, Gregory begins his first year at Abbott as a full-time teacher and continues to date Taylor; however during "Delivery Day", Taylor breaks up with him. Following his breakup with Taylor, Gregory begins dating Amber, the parent of a student in Janine's class much to her unspoken jealously. He begins co-teaching a podcasting club with Jacob during "Read-A-Thon".

Ava Coleman 

Ava Coleman is the school's inept principal who enjoys picking on and bullying her co-workers, specifically Janine. She also harbors an attraction to Gregory, which she does not hide well.She is also an avid user of social media and often focuses on it rather than her responsibilities of being principal.

Season 1 
The first season showcases Ava's carelessness and antics on full display. During the pilot, it is revealed that Ava obtained her job as principal after blackmailing Superintendent Collins, who she caught cheating on his wife. However during "Open House", Collins visits Abbott and tells Ava that he had divorced his wife and is now married to the woman he was caught with by Ava, and that she is at risk of losing her job. In the penultimate episode of the first season, Ava wins over the district and the superintendent, and keeps her job.

Season 2 
Following her successful presentation to the district, Ava continues to her normal antics. Ava fails to see the everyday struggles of teachers, but she somewhat comes to an understanding during "Sick Day", where she must substitute for Janine when she is out sick.

Melissa Schemmenti 

Melissa Schemmenti is a second-grade teacher at Abbott, who has a large family with questionable connections. She has a close connection with Barbara, with both being veteran teachers at Abbott. Melissa's family is native to the local fire department, and is referenced in numerous episodes.

Season 1 
During the first season, Melissa's connections are introduced which worry the staff of Abbott; however they never question it since a large percentage of the time it benefits them. Melissa begins going out with the vending machine stocker, Gary; which continues into the second season, although he is unseen.

Season 2 
In the second season, when classes get combined due to a teacher shortage, Melissa receives ten third-grade students in her second-grade class. This proves to be to difficult to keep up with on her own, and the school offers her an aide in the distracting and childish Ashley Garcia, who only causes more problems for Melissa. Melissa is revealed to have a sister, Kristen Marie, who she has a rivalry with. When Janine attempts to salvage their bond, Melissa reveals that Kristen Marie left her alone with the responsibilities of her sick grandmother, and disrespected her when the funeral came around.

Jacob Hill 

Jacob Hill is an awkward and occasionally pessimistic 6th grade history teacher at Abbott who supports Janine and her mission.

Season 1 
In the first season, Jacob reveals that he is one of two teachers remaining from a large number of new hires; the other being Janine. He mentions his boyfriend Zach to Janine in "Work Family"; which leads to upset Janine that he never mentioned him prior. He introduces his boyfriend Zach to the staff in "Desking", to help stop the spread of a TikTok trend.

Season 2 
In the second season, Jacob continues to support Janine after a grant of money is given to the school thanks to Barbara. When an educational dance troupe visits Abbott, Jacob reveals that he is a former member of the 'Story Samurai' that travels from school to school. He begins co-teaching a podcasting club with Gregory during "Read-A-Thon".

Barbara Howard 

Barbara Howard is an old-school and strictly religious kindergarten teacher whom Janine looks up to. Barbara is based upon Quinta Brunson's mother who was also a teacher.

Season 1 
During the first season, Barbara reveals that she is wary of new technology and prefers to teach the way she has for her entire career. This is referenced in "New Tech", where Barbara cheats a new system provided by the school and is forced to come clean for her mistakes of not wanting to use the new program. Barbara has a husband named Gerald (portrayed by Richard Brooks) who visits her for lunch on occasion. In "Open House", her daughter Taylor visits and she is displeased with her career choice. Taylor eventually begins dating Gregory. In "Ava vs. Superintendent" she bribes school board member Delisha Sloss into giving the school a loan. She ponders retirement while on the school field trip to the zoo during the season finale after her favorite zoo animal is retired, but ultimately she stays with Abbott.

Season 2 
In the second season, Barbara is forced to be the middle man in the relationship of Taylor and Gregory and has to be the one to tell him that their relationship is over. In "Attack Ad", a former student of Barbara named Draemond Winding visits after an ad orchestrated by him takes a jab at the school. Her husband Gerald has a health scare later in the season, as she reveals to Melissa that he was tested for prostate cancer; however she reveals the test came back negative, but it still worried for his health.

Mr. Johnson 

Mr. Johnson is the school's eccentric, but surprisingly talented, janitor. After being credited as a guest star during the first season, Stanford Davis was upped to a series regular for the second season.

Not much is known about Mr. Johnson outside of Abbott, but he believes in conspiracy theories and shares them with the students despite the teachers being uncomfortable with his suspicions. He is known to mess with the students and staff of Abbott, most notably being with Jacob on Halloween, when he convinced him that the ghost of the former-now dead janitor lives in the basement.

Additional school staff

Introduced in season 1

Tina Schwartz 
 Portrayed by Kate Peterman
Tina Schwartz is an overwhelmed teacher who gets fired for physically attacking a student during the pilot episode. She returns in "Delivery Day", revealing that she attended therapy and now works at a more pristine charter school, Addington Elementary. She is featured in the attack ad made against Abbott, orchestrated by Draemond.

Shanae and Devin 
 Portrayed by Nikea Gamby-Turner and Reggie Conquest
Shanae and Devin are underpaid cafeteria workers at Abbott, who find Janine overly pushy and mildly annoying. In "Art Teacher", Devin refuses to allow Jacob and Barbara to make new menu items for the cafeteria, as he and the rest of the custodians have no time to prepare extra food. Both Shanae and Devin are against Janine's idea to have a new juice in the cafeteria, as seen in "Juice".

Sahar 
 Portrayed by Mitra Jouhari
Sahar is Janine's friend who briefly works at Abbott as a volunteer art teacher during the events of "Art Teacher". She and Melissa disagree over the latter's Peter Rabbit project, and though Janine agrees with Melissa, she finds it hard to turn down Sahar's ideas. When Sahar makes an impressive art piece using the books Melissa bought, Janine finally stands up to her. Her real name is revealed to be Sarah.

Denzel Collins 
 Portrayed by Reggie Hayes 
Denzel Collins is the school's superintendent who, during the first season, is blackmailed by Ava to keep her job; after she caught him cheating on his wife. However, he reveals to Ava that he married his mistress and divorced his wife in "Open House" which puts her in a tough position. He later allows Ava to keep her job as principal.

Alley Williams 
 Portrayed by Ambrit Millhouse
Alley Williams is a minor recurring teacher at Abbott who has been a teacher for nine years. She only makes an appearance in one episode during the first season, however she becomes a recurring character during the second season. She is mentioned in "Attack Ad", where Jacob and Gregory talk about a parent of Alley's student who was arrested for protesting at a strip club.

Delisha Sloss 
 Portrayed by Shirley Jordan
Delisha Sloss is a member of the school board and a member of Barbara's church who she shakes down for a loan to the school during "Ava vs. Superintendent". Delisha reappears during the second season; being scammed at the mall by a student participating in Barbara's fundraiser.

Introduced in season 2

Ashley Garcia 
 Portrayed by Keyla Monterroso Mejia
Ashley Garcia is a childish and easily distracted teachers aide that is hired by the district for Melissa after she struggled to maintain her combined second and third grade classes. She befriends Ava after buying a shirt from her now defunct web-store. In "Candy Zombies", Ashley is put in charge of watching the bags of candy, however she is distracted by her phone and the candy is stolen and distributed amongst the students.

Draemond Winding 
 Portrayed by Leslie Odom Jr.
Draemond Winding is the owner of Legendary Schools, a company who plans to make Abbott a charter school. He is a former student of Barbara, as he was a student in her first class at Abbott. He reassures her that his plan will help her, but she insists that it will only cause more problems for the school and its teachers. He appears at an open house in hopes of convincing parents to support his plans, however they turn against him and rally in support of Abbott after questioning charter schools as a whole.

Venus 
 Portrayed by Erika T. Johnson
Venus is a staff member of Abbott who works closely with Ava, typically delivering mail to her office during important occasions.

Mr. Morton 
 Portrayed by Jerry Minor
Mr. Morton is an eighth grade science teacher who works with Jacob; despite their butting-head relationship. First appearing in "Egg Drop", he is annoyed with Janine for insisting her class take part in his egg drop experiment that he is conducting with his class. He does not like Jacob and both have a passive aggressive relationship with one another.

Tasha Hoffman 
 Portrayed by Taylor Garron
Tasha Hoffman is a teacher at Abbott who typically avoids Janine, and is very briefly befriended by Melissa and Barbara when she is away. Jacob takes a disliking to her, given her disrespect towards Janine.

Friends and family of staff

Introduced in season 1

Tariq Temple 
 Portrayed by Zack Fox
Tariq Temple is Janine's slightly selfish and so-called "feminist" boyfriend (later ex) since middle school who is an aspiring rapper. Throughout the events of the first season, he proves to Janine that his career and gigs as a rapper overpower the simple things Janine wants him to do at home. He gets a call from New York during "Zoo Balloon", where he is given an opportunity of more gigs. He leaves Philadelphia and Janine behind and moves to New York at the end of the first season. He returns in "Attack Ad" to gather the things he left at Janine's apartment. He asks Janine out to dinner at Bahama Breeze, and she accepts. Later however, she ultimately does not go and Tariq invites his new girlfriend from New York instead. He is briefly hired by Legendary Charters during the second season, but is eventually fired following a lawsuit; about the jingle he made for Legendary sounding similar to "California Love"

Amber 
 Portrayed by Naté Jones
Amber is the parent of a student at Abbott. In the first season, Amber brings her son Joel into Gregory's class late, unknowingly preventing him from exceeding the amount of learning he should accomplish. Her son is moved to Janine's class in the second season, where she attempts to ask Gregory out by giving him her phone number through Janine. She and Gregory begin dating afterwards, much to Janine's jealousy. However their relationship ends towards the end of the season, after both realize they are polar opposites.

Taylor Howard 
 Portrayed by Iyana Halley
Taylor Howard is Barbara's daughter who begins dating Gregory after visiting the school for open house. She works for an alcohol-adjacent company, which Barbara disapproves of; instead wanting her to be a teacher, much like Janine. She accompanies the school during their field trip to the zoo. In the second season, while unseen, Taylor breaks up with Gregory for being a "broke boi".

Martin Eddie 
 Portrayed by Orlando Jones
Martin Eddie is Gregory's unsupportive father who wants him to do more with his life than just be a school teacher. He is a retired Military Lieutenant Colonel and owns a landscaping business; which he attempts to force Gregory into. He makes an appearance via a video call during the first season and appears physically during "Fight".

Jones was cast as Gregory's father after online Twitter users pointed out that Jones and Williams look exactly alike.

Zach 
 Portrayed by Larry Owens
Zach is Jacob's boyfriend who helps the school, and accompanies them on their field trip to the zoo, by serving as a chaperone. He returns during the second season cameoing in "Holiday Hookah", where he volunteers as a music teacher for the school. He returns later in the season, becoming a recurring character.

Introduced in season 2

Kristen Marie Schemmenti 
 Portrayed by Lauren Weedman
Kristin Marie Schemmenti is Melissa's sister who works at Addington Elementary, a rival charter school. First seen in the second season episode "Delivery Day", Kristin Marie is shamed by Melissa while visiting Addington, leading to Janine to discover that her and Melissa are sisters. In "The Principals Office", Janine attempts to rekindle her relationship with Melissa, but fails. She returns later in the season, where she and Melissa begin to rekindle their relationship; telling Melissa about Draemond's plan to turn Abbott into a charter school.

Erika 
 Portrayed by Courtney Taylor
Erika is a friend of Janine from her relationship with Tariq, and is the parent of a student in Janine's class. She later becomes Janine's best-friend and invites her to parties in hopes of improving her social mobility, while also being aware of Janine and Gregory's will-they won’t-they relationship.

Maurice 
 Portrayed by Vince Staples
Maurice is charming and a close friend of Gregory who takes a liking to Janine. He first appears during "Holiday Hookah", where he visits a hookah bar with Gregory; and later appears during "The Fundraiser", where he asks Janine out on a date, to which she accepts. They begin dating following this, much to the unspoken jealousy of Gregory. Following Janine and Gregory kissing at a teacher conference, they both decide to tell Maurice the truth, to which he takes well. However, when Janine breaks up with him, he pushes both of them away. He is nicknamed "Mo" by the staff of Abbott.

Ayesha Teagues 
 Portrayed by Ayo Edebiri
Ayesha is Janine's distant sister who she has a struggle with getting to visit her. She is first mentioned during "The Principals Office" when Janine expresses her relationship with Ayesha to Melissa in an attempt to rekindle her relationship with her sister, and later during "Fight" where Janine calls Ayesha asking her to visit. She ultimately appears in a FaceTime call during "Valentine's Day", when Janine calls Ayesha for her birthday with the company of Jacob.

Students and other minor characters

Students introduced in season 1

Courtney Pierce 
 Portrayed by Lela Hoffmeister
Courtney is formerly a student of Melissa who is later troublesome for Janine when transferred to her class. After discussion, Melissa and Janine realize that Courtney is not challenged as much as she should be. She later returns in the second season, aiding Ava during her Shark Tank-style debate for the school's grant money. She re-appears later in the season.

Will 
 Portrayed by Levi Mynatt
Will is a student of Abbott who is primarily known amongst other students for his dancing. He is most notably featured in "New Tech", when his teacher Barbara cheats a new reading system; being impressed by the work Barbara has presumably done with her students, Ava asks Will, the lowest-performing student in his class, to read Becoming at a school assembly. Will tries his hardest but Barbara still comes clean about cheating. Will also appears in various other episodes, as a background character.

Students introduced in season 2

Clarence 
 Portrayed by Zakai Biagas Bey
Clarence is a student of Jacob who regularly calls him "Mr. C". In "Read-A-Thon", Clarence becomes a member of the podcasting club started by Jacob and Gregory; but ultimately leaves after Jacob refuses to take him and the other member seriously. He rejoins, and interviews Janine about her night with Gregory at the hookah club.

Minor characters in season 1 
 Jim Gardner as himself, a news anchor on ABC Channel 6 Action News, beloved by the staff.
 Brian Scolaro as Vinny, a friend of Melissa who is a criminal.
 Bruno Amato as Gary, the vending machine stocker who later becomes Melissa's affectionate boyfriend. Amato has guest starred in both seasons.

Minor characters in season 2 
 Gritty as himself, the mascot of the Philadelphia Flyers who Janine hires for a school mixer.
 Zach Evans, Maise Klompos and James III as Tyrone, Megan and Harold, members of a dance troupe that visit Abbott.
 Raven Goodwin as Krystal, the mother of a student in Barbara's class who wears inappropriate clothing.
 Bella-Rose Love as Trinity, a student of Janine.
 Andre Iguodala as Iggy, a professional basketball player who Ava is dating.
 Blaiz Bahsi Baker as Mya Okafor, a student of Melissa who struggles with reading.
 Kingston Covington as Raheem, a student of Jacob who joins his podcasting club.
 Chinedu Unaka as Tristan, a parent of Jacob's class who has a problem with him teaching Black History.
 Mike O'Malley as Captain Robinson, the captain of the local fire station who visits Abbott after Barbara accidentally starts a fire in the teachers lounge.
 Shalita Grant as Miss Janet, a counselor sent to Abbott following Barbara's accidental fire.
 Carolyn Gilroy as Summer, a teacher at Addington Elementary who befriends Jacob at a teacher conference.
 Maggie Carney as Dawn Nichols, the owner of a school supply company who hooks Barbara and Melissa up with new supplies.
 Shwayze as Gabe, a representative of the Philadelphia mural arts who visits Abbott after being invited by Jacob.
 Darryl Lee-Canyon as Darrell, a teacher at Abbott.
 Nicole Dele as Ms. Pinkey, a health class teacher at Abbott who competes with the other staff for 76ers tickets.
 Christian Crosby as himself, a reporter at a Philadelphia 76ers game who interviews Mr. Johnson.

References 

Television characters introduced in 2021
Abbott Elementary